
Wągrowiec County is a unit of territorial administration and local government (powiat) in Greater Poland Voivodeship, west-central Poland. It came into being on January 1, 1999, as a result of the Polish local government reforms passed in 1998.

As of 2006 its total population is 67,606, out of which the population of Wągrowiec is 24,681, that of Skoki is 3,866, that of Gołańcz is 3,342, and the rural population is 35,717.

Neighbouring counties
Wągrowiec County is bordered by Nakło County to the north-east, Żnin County to the east, Gniezno County to the south-east, Poznań County to the south, Oborniki County to the west, and Chodzież County and Piła County to the north-west.

Administrative division
The county is subdivided into seven gminas (one urban, two urban-rural and four rural). These are listed in the following table, in descending order of population.

References
Polish official population figures 2006

 
Land counties of Greater Poland Voivodeship